Sheikh Badin National Park (also spelled Sheikh Badddin National Park)  is located near Darra Pezu in the Dera Ismail Khan and Lakki Marwat districts of Khyber Pakhtunkhwa, Pakistan. It is located among the Sheikh Badin Hills, which is an eastern extension of the Sulaiman Mountains. The park was established in 2003 and covers an area of 15,540 hectares.

During the research of the bird population in the park, 41 species were found, about 3408 individuals. Of these, 18 species were migratory birds.

During research 23 herpetofauna species, including 02 amphibian and 21 reptile, were observed

Scientific research work published on the basis of research and identification of flora in the park, revealed 107 plant species.

Wildlife

Avifauna

Amphibians and reptiles

References

National parks of Pakistan
Dera Ismail Khan District
Protected areas established in 2003
2003 establishments in Pakistan
Protected areas of Khyber Pakhtunkhwa
Parks in Khyber Pakhtunkhwa